Milija Zdravković-Resavac (1765–1814)  was an obor-knez during the First Serbian Uprising and a representative of the Ćuprija nahiyah in the cabinet of Matija Nenadović in 1805.
 
The Zdravković ancestors hail from the village northeast of Niš. Knyaz Milija Zdravković was born in Lomnica, the Resava Principality of the Ćuprija Nahiya. Milija was a member of Karađorđe's Governing State Council for the Ćuprija Nahiya. After the first revolution was quelled in 1813, he surrendered to the Turkish authorities in 1813 but was killed in 1814 in Belgrade.

Milija Zdravković had two sons, the oldest Milosav (who, according to Mateja Nenadović, took over his father's title of Knyaz of the Resava Principality of the Ćuprija Nahiya), and Dobrosav.

See also
 List of Serbian Revolutionaries

References 

 From Serbian Wikipedia: Здравковићи

1765 births
1814 deaths
First Serbian Uprising
People from Despotovac
Serbian politicians
Politicians from Belgrade
People executed by the Ottoman Empire
Serbian revolutionaries